Weser Valley may refer to:

 Upper Weser Valley, in the German federal states of Lower Saxony, Hesse and North Rhine-Westphalia
 Middle Weser Valley, in the German federal states of Lower Saxony and North Rhine-Westphalia
 Weser Depression, the river basin from Porta Westfalica, in Lower Saxony
  Wesertal, a municipality in the district of Kassel, Hesse, Germany

See also
 Porta Westfalica (gorge)